Paul Antony Darling  is an English commercial law barrister, King's Counsel and current chair of the Horserace Betting Levy Board.

Early life and education 
Darling grew up in Cleadon in County Durham and went to Tonstall School in Sunderland before attending Winchester School and then St Edmund Hall College, Oxford. His mother was a magistrate and his brother Ian Darling is a British circuit judge. Darling's grandfather was Newcastle United player Jack Allen.

Career 
Darling was called to the bar at Middle Temple in 1983, and in 1999 was appointed King's Counsel. He was also called to the Northern Ireland Bar.

In 2010, Darling became head of Keating Chambers where he remained until 2017. He then took the unusual step of moving chambers, joining general commercial set, 39 Essex Chambers.

His areas of practice include construction and engineering, procurement, domestic and international arbitration – areas in which he has been ranked at tier or band 2 levels by The Legal 500 and Chambers and Partners directories. He is deputy treasurer of Middle Temple for 2023.

Significant cases
Darling has been instructed as lead counsel on several significant cases.
 Between 1991 and 2003 he represented the contractor in McAlpine v Panatown & Unex. The dispute involved all aspects of construction law and professional negligence, and culminated in a 14-week Technology and Construction Court trial. The case is often referenced in English contract law education as a result of the issues raised around the rights of third parties or Privity of contract. 
 Darling represented the appellants, Scarborough Borough Council, in a 1997 case concerning the collapse of Scarborough's Holbeck Hall Hotel into the sea (captured live on television news).
 In the 2011 case of Flannery & Another -v- Halifax Estate Agencies Limited, Darling represented the plaintiffs.

Horse racing
In 2006 Darling was appointed as a non-executive member of the Horserace Totalisator Board or “Tote”. Between 2008 and 2014, he was a government-appointed member of the Horserace Betting Levy Board. He was chairman of the Sports Grounds Safety Authority between 2009 and 2015. He was appointed chairman of the Association of British Bookmakers in 2014. In 2020 he was appointed chairman of the Horserace Betting Levy Board.

Publications 
Darling has written and edited several articles and books, and his cases and work have been described in learned and peer-reviewed journals. Examples include:

 Who Do You Want? Who Do You Get? Appointing the Right Arbitrator, a peer-reviewed article in Asian Dispute Review in 2010

 Lafarge (Aggregates) Ltd v Newham London Borough Council - case review in Arbitration Law Reports and Review

 Straight There No Detours: Direct Access to Barristers, a research paper by the University of Westminster

 Wilmot-Smith on Construction Contracts, 4th Ed. 2021 (Co-Editor)

Honours
In the 2015 Birthday Honours, Darling became the third member of his family to be appointed to the Order of the British Empire. He was recognised for his services to sport safety and horse racing.

References 

21st-century King's Counsel
English King's Counsel
Year of birth missing (living people)
Living people
Members of the Middle Temple
People educated at Winchester College
Alumni of St Edmund Hall, Oxford
Members of the Bar of Northern Ireland